Teracotona pallida is a moth in the family Erebidae. It was described by James John Joicey and George Talbot in 1924. It is found in Rwanda.

References

Moths described in 1924
Spilosomina